Ramelsloh is a village in the district of Harburg, in Lower Saxony, Germany.
It is situated on a small river Seeve, 30 km south of Hamburg.
There are approximately 1600 people living within the village.
Since July 1st 1972, Ramelsloh is a member of the municipality Seevetal.

Ramelsloh is known as the home of the annual Heiderock Festival. A music festival celebrating Irish and Scottish music and culture.

Villages in Lower Saxony